The seventh Minnesota Territorial Legislature first convened on January 2, 1856. The 15 members of the Minnesota Territorial Council and the 38 members of the Minnesota House of Representatives were elected during the General Election of October 9, 1855.

Sessions 
The territorial legislature met in a regular session from January 2, 1856 to March 1, 1856. There were no special sessions of the seventh territorial legislature.

Party summary 
Resignations and new members are discussed in the "Membership changes" section, below.

Council

House of Representatives

Leadership 
President of the Council
John B. Brisbin (D-Saint Paul)

Speaker of the House
Charles Gardner (D-Mantorville)

Members

Council

House of Representatives

Membership changes

Council

House of Representatives

Notes

References 

 Minnesota Legislators Past & Present - Session Search Results (Session 0.7, Senate)
 Minnesota Legislators Past & Present - Session Search Results (Session 0.7, House)

00.7th
1850s in Minnesota Territory